The broad-snouted catfish (Neoarius latirostris) is a species of catfish in the family Ariidae. It was described by William John Macleay in 1883, originally under the genus Arius. It inhabits freshwater rivers in Indonesia and Papua New Guinea. Its diet includes finfish, mollusks, prawns, terrestrial arthropods, aquatic insects, and plants.

The IUCN redlist currently lists the broad-snouted catfish as Least Concern, but makes note of a present decline in the species' population. It cites fishing/harvesting, mining, quarrying, and residential developments as the main threats to the species.

References

Ariidae
Fish described in 1883